The East Grinstead by-election 1965 was a parliamentary by-election for the East Grinstead constituency of the British House of Commons held on 4 February 1965.

The by-election was held following conferment of a life peerage on Evelyn Emmet.

Previous result

Result
It was a Conservative hold.

References 

UK General Elections since 1832 

By-elections to the Parliament of the United Kingdom in West Sussex constituencies
1965 elections in the United Kingdom
1965 in England
East Grinstead
20th century in Sussex